Zenobia (also known as Elephants Never Forget (UK) and It's Spring Again) is a 1939 comedy film directed by Gordon Douglas and starring Oliver Hardy, Harry Langdon, Billie Burke, Alice Brady, James Ellison, Jean Parker, June Lang, Stepin Fetchit and Hattie McDaniel. The source of the film was the 1891 short story "Zenobia's Infidelity" by H.C. Bunner, which was originally purchased by producer Hal Roach as a vehicle for Roland Young.

Plot
In 1870, Dr. Henry Tibbett, a Mississippi country doctor is called on by a travelling circus trainer to cure his sick elephant. After the doctor heals the grateful beast, the elephant becomes so attached to him that it starts to follow him everywhere. This leads to the trainer suing Dr. Tibbett for alienation of affection.

The presence of the elephant also endangers the engagement of Dr.Tibbett's daughter Mary to the son of the prominent Carter family,
who are social snobs looking for an excuse to call off the wedding.

Things are resolved to everyone's satisfaction when the "male" elephant is discovered to be pregnant; and Dr.Tibbett helps deliver a healthy baby pachyderm.

Cast 
 Oliver Hardy as Dr. Tibbett
 Harry Langdon as Prof. McCrackle
 Billie Burke as Mrs. Tibbett
 Alice Brady as Mrs. Carter
 James Ellison as Jeff Carter
 Jean Parker as Mary Tibbett
 June Lang as Virginia
 Olin Howland as Attorney Culpepper
 J. Farrell MacDonald as the Judge
 Stepin Fetchit as Zero
 Hattie McDaniel as Dehlia (credited as "Hattie McDaniels")
 Philip Hurlic as Zeke (Declaration of Independence)
 Hobart Cavanaugh as Mr. Dover
 Clem Bevans as the Sheriff
 Tommy Mack as the Butcher
 Robert Dudley as the Court Clerk
 The Hall Johnson Choir 
 Zenobia as 'Miss Zenobia' - the Elephant 
 Chester Conklin as Farmer (uncredited)
 Nigel De Brulier as Townsman (uncredited)

Background 
Zenobia is one of the few films after the teaming of Laurel and Hardy that features Hardy without Stan Laurel, the result of a contract dispute between Laurel and producer Hal Roach, who maintained separate contracts for each performer, rather than a team contract, which would have offered them more control over their careers. Zenobia was Roach's attempt to create a new comedic pair without Laurel, and a series of films with Hardy and Langdon was planned. The dispute was short-lived, however, and Laurel and Hardy were reunited shortly thereafter.

Reception 
The film was a box-office disaster. United Artists even had trouble booking the film into theatres.

The New York Times wrote on May 15, 1939, that the film:

"...[was] a rough idea of what would happen to Gone With the Wind if Hal Roach had produced it ... an antebellum, costume romance in slapstick, in which an elephant adopts Oliver Hardy and, it appears, Harry Langdon has adopted the partnership perquisites formerly reserved for Stan Laurel."

Then—playing on the potential for a new comedy team of Hardy and Langdon—the reviewer said:

"Harry Langdon's pale and beautifully blank countenance ... has probably already excited the professional jealousy of Mr. Laurel."

In popular culture
The film is mentioned quite frequently (referred to as "the elephant movie") during the  Stan and Ollie biopic. In the film, Laurel begrudged Hardy for doing the film; however, this was not the case in real life, as it was Laurel himself who encouraged Hardy to continue at Hal Roach Studios without him. After his contract was up, Hardy refused to form a new team with Langdon, left Roach, and followed Laurel to 20th Century Fox.

Restoration
The 35mm nitrate stock was digitally restored, and released on dvd in 2018.
Unrestored and restored comparisons of the same scenes appear side-by-side in the menu's 'Special Features'. 
Millions of imperfections were removed.

Music 
 The music is by Marvin Hatley, the composer of "Dance of the Cuckoos", Laurel and Hardy's famous theme song.

See also
 Filmography of Oliver Hardy

Notes

External links

 
 
1926-1957 Legendary Laurel & Hardy's 31+ years still Record Long comic duo Partnership / boys' legacy, unequaled longevity!!!
The AFI Catalog of Feature Films:..Zenobia

1939 films
American black-and-white films
1939 comedy films
1930s English-language films
Films about elephants
Films directed by Gordon Douglas
Films set in 1870
Films set in Mississippi
Films based on short fiction
United Artists films
American comedy films
1930s American films
English-language comedy films